Langjökull (Icelandic for "long glacier") is the second largest ice cap in Iceland (953 km2), after Vatnajökull. It is situated in the west of the Icelandic interior or Highlands of Iceland and can be seen clearly from Haukadalur.

In the past, the largest recorded surface area was in 1840.

Situation and form

The glacier is roughly parallel to the direction of the country's active volcanic zone: north-east to south-west. It is the nearest large glacier to Reykjavík.

The area of the glacier includes some mountains, e.g. Jarlhettur ("The earl's hat") on the east side of Langjökull, a palagonitic mountain range, which originated in a fissure vent under a glacier during the Ice Age.

The mountain Skríðufell  is situated on the east, above lake Hvítárvatn. Other mountains on the eastern side of Langjökull are Fjallkirkja , Þursaborg  and Péturshorn .

A little to the east of Fjallkirkja is the hut of the Icelandic Glacier Research Society (Jöklarannsóknarfélag), which includes scientists as well as interested amateurs.

Glaciers in the area

A number of outlet glaciers reach down from Langjökull to the valleys and plains below. These include Norðurjökull  and Suðurjökull  to the east; Vestri-Hagafellsjökull  and Eystri-Hagafellsjökull  at the southern end of Langjökull which are separated by the mountain Hagafell ; and Þrístapajökull  to the west. Geitlandsjökull (1395m) is an outpost to the southwest, a glacier covering a tuya which is connected to Langjökull.

Research shows that the outlet glaciers Norður- and Suðurjökull reached as far as lake Hvítárvatn until about 1900 but have retreated rapidly since then.

Water flow and development of the glacier
Despite the size of Langjökull, not many rivers directly originate there. However research has shown that large quantities of water flow in sub-surface streams to lake Þingvallavatn (some 50 km to the south and easily accessible to tourists) and reappear in springs in and around the lake, while the same happens on the west side, giving rise to various tributaries of the Hvítá River as well as some rivers flowing north towards Húnaflói. Thus many of the hot springs in the Borgarfjörður region (near the estuary of the Hvítá on the west coast), such as Deildartunguhver, receive ground water from Langjökull.

The same is true for the lake Hvítárvatn to the east: ⅔ of its waters appear to come from Langjökull by underwater channels.

Langjökull is shrinking quite fast, and some researchers believe that it will disappear in about 150 years if climate change continues at its recent pace.

Volcanism

Under Langjökull there are two or more volcanic systems. The calderas can easily be seen from the air. The best known of these is Hveravellir with its hot spring and high temperature area to the east of the glacier. During an Ice Age some shield volcanoes of this system covered the plains with lava in the region of today's Kjölur mountain road: the Kjalhraun (hraun means "lava field"). The lava field is about 7,800 years old.

A smaller volcanic system lies to the north-west of the glacier in the Arnarvatnsheiði , north of the glacier Eiríksjökull. About 1,000 years ago, the craters of this system produced the lava field Hallmundarhraun  which extends some 50 km westward into the valley of the Hvítá, and is traversed by underground streams which emerge at the waterfalls of Hraunfossar not far from Húsafell.

Another volcanic system to the south-west of Langjökull is Presthnúkur, named after its central volcano, a rhyolite dome with a high temperature area at its foot. Its fissures extend under Langjökull.

Volcanically, the region is relatively quiet, compared to other regions in Iceland, with just 32 eruptions in the last 10,000 years.

Highland roads

Two highland tracks, open in the summer months, lead alongside this glacier: the Kaldidalur and Kjölur tracks.

The former (road 550) runs along the west of Langjökull, between it and the small Ok glacier. To the south it leads towards Þingvellir and Reykjavík, while to the north it leads to the Hvítá valley which leads down towards Borgarnes. Kaldidalur is no longer classified by the Icelandic road authorities as an F-road. Nevertheless, rental car companies forbid their clients to drive on the road with other cars than four-wheel drives. 
Road F551 goes right to the edge of the glacier from Kaldidalur.

The latter (road F35) runs along the east side of Langjökull, between it and Hofsjökull. It is the main route across the interior between the main population centres in the SW and the N of the country, but nevertheless traffic is extremely sparse.

In popular culture 
The glacier is featured in the final scene of the 1999 animated film The Iron Giant, directed by Brad Bird, where the titular Giant's parts, scattered by his destruction at the film's climax, converge on his head to begin reassembling him.

See also
 Geography of Iceland
 Iceland plume
 List of glaciers
 List of glaciers of Iceland
 List of islands of Iceland
 List of lakes of Iceland
 List of rivers of Iceland
 List of volcanoes in Iceland
 List of waterfalls of Iceland

References

External links

Langjökull in the Catalogue of Icelandic Volcanoes
Photo of Langjökull
Gwenn E. Flowers, Helgi Björnsson, Áslaug Geirsdóttir,  Gifford H. Miller and Garry K.C. Clark:Glacier fluctuation and inferred climatology of Langjokull through the little Ice Age. in: Quaternary Science Reviews, Vol. 26, 2007
 Erdbebenüberwachung am Langjökull
Sveinn Jakobson u.a., Volcanic systems and segmentation of the plate boundaries in S-W-Iceland
 Skiing on the glacier

Highlands of Iceland
Bodies of ice of Iceland
Ice caps
Volcanic systems of Iceland
West Volcanic Zone of Iceland